"Hell Yeah" is a song recorded by American hard rock band Rev Theory. It was released in March 2008 as the second single from their 2008 album, Light It Up. It was produced by Brian Howes and officially released March 25 on the iTunes Store. This song was also made the theme song for the TV show Blue Mountain State.

Music video
The band shot the video in Palmdale and Adelanto, California with director Travis Kopach, who has done previous work for bands such as Thursday, Panic! at the Disco and Black Tide. The video also featured an appearance from the late 2005 WWE Raw Diva Search winner, and former Survivor: China contestant Ashley Massaro.

The video begins with the band inside of a diner at the Four Aces Movie Ranch when they are attracted by the arrival of Ashley who secretly steals Rich's keys to his 1967 Ford Galaxie. Rich realizes this and grabs the cook's 1965 Pontiac Gto to go after Ashley in a lengthy car chase until he successfully tracks her down at Murphy's, resulting the video to end on a cliffhanger after he goes inside. Shots of the band performing at a destroyed aircraft are also shown.

The video premiered on the Xbox Live Marketplace on May 28, 2008, a first for Xbox Live.

Other information
The song was used as theme song for the 2008 WWE PPV One Night Stand in addition to the TV show Blue Mountain State.
In the video game Madden NFL 09, An edited version changed the title and chorus to the words "Hey Yeah", which was also reused in NHL 16 as the goal song for the Winnipeg Jets.
The song was used as a goal song for the NHL's Buffalo Sabres, Winnipeg Jets and Edmonton Oilers.

References

External links
Official Rev Theory Website 

2008 songs
2008 singles
Rev Theory songs
Interscope Records singles
Songs written by Brian Howes
Alternative metal songs